Eomyctophum is an extinct genus of prehistoric ray-finned fish.

References

Myctophiformes